Wildest Dreams may refer to:

Theater and television 
 Wildest Dreams (play), a 1991 play by Alan Ayckbourn
 Wildest Dreams (TV series), a 2009 UK reality series
 "Wildest Dreams" (The Flash), a 2023 episode of The Flash

Music 
 Wildest Dreams, a 1960 musical by Julian Slade
 Wildest Dreams Tour, a 1996–1997 concert tour by Tina Turner

Albums
 Wildest Dreams (Tina Turner album), 1996
 Wildest Dreams (John Berry album), 1999
 Wildest Dreams (Saga album), 1987
 Wildest Dreams (Majid Jordan album), 2021

Songs
 "Wildest Dreams" (Iron Maiden song), 2003
 "Wildest Dreams" (Brandy song), 2012
 "Wildest Dreams" (Taylor Swift song), 2015
 "Wildest Dreams", by Asia from Asia
 "Wildest Dreams", by Dolly Parton from Eagle When She Flies
 "Wildest Dreams", by Ryan Adams from 1989
 "Wildest Dreams", by Ten from The Name of the Rose
 "Wildest Dreams", by Tom Cochrane from Ragged Ass Road

See also
The Wildest Dream, a documentary film about the British climber George Mallory
"Your Wildest Dreams", a song by The Moody Blues, 1986
In Your Wildest Dreams (disambiguation)
In My Wildest Dreams (disambiguation)
"Beyond My Wildest Dreams", a song from the Mark Knopfler and Emmylou Harris album All the Roadrunning